The 2020 Pennzoil 400 presented by Jiffy Lube was a NASCAR Cup Series race held on February 23, 2020, at Las Vegas Motor Speedway in Las Vegas. Contested over 267 laps on the  asphalt intermediate speedway, it was the second race of the 2020 NASCAR Cup Series season. It was the first NASCAR Cup Series race run without Ryan Newman and David Ragan in the field since Loudon, 2001 and Homestead, 2006 respectively. Joey Logano was the race winner.

Report

Background

Las Vegas Motor Speedway, located in Clark County, Nevada outside the Las Vegas city limits and about 15 miles northeast of the Las Vegas Strip, is a  complex of multiple tracks for motorsports racing. The complex is owned by Speedway Motorsports, Inc., which is headquartered in Charlotte, North Carolina.

Entry list
 (R) denotes rookie driver.
 (i) denotes driver who are ineligible for series driver points.

Practice

First practice

Final practice

Qualifying
Qualifying for Saturday was cancelled due to rain and Kyle Busch was awarded the pole as a result.

Starting Lineup

Polesitter Kyle Busch, Denny Hamlin, and Christopher Bell all started at the back after failing inspection.

Race

Stage Results

Stage One
Laps: 80

Stage Two
Laps: 80

Final Stage Results

Stage Three
Laps: 107

Race statistics
 Lead changes: 25 among 7 different drivers
 Cautions/Laps: 9 for 37
 Red flags: 0
 Time of race: 2 hours, 58 minutes and 11 seconds
 Average speed:

Media

Television
Fox Sports covered their 20th race at the Las Vegas Motor Speedway. Mike Joy and 2001 race winner Jeff Gordon called from the booth for the race. Jamie Little, Regan Smith, Vince Welch and Matt Yocum handled the pit road duties for the television side. Larry McReynolds and Jamie McMurray provided insight from the Fox Sports studio in Charlotte.

Radio
PRN covered the radio call for the race which was simulcasted on Sirius XM NASCAR Radio. Doug Rice and Mark Garrow called the race in the booth when the field raced through the tri-oval. Rob Albright called the race from a billboard in turn 2 when the field raced through turns 1 and 2. Pat Patterson called the race from a billboard outside of turn 3 when the field raced through turns 3 and 4. Brad Gillie, Brett McMillan, Wendy Venturini and Heather DeBeaux worked pit road for the radio side.

Standings after the race

Drivers' Championship standings

Manufacturers' Championship standings

Note: Only the first 16 positions are included for the driver standings.

References

2020 in sports in Nevada
2020 NASCAR Cup Series
February 2020 sports events in the United States
NASCAR races at Las Vegas Motor Speedway